William Galbraith may refer to:

 William Galbraith (mathematician) (1786–1850), Scottish mathematician
 William Galbraith (athlete) (1885–1937), Canadian athlete at the 1908 Summer Olympics
 William Galbraith (American football), former head coach of the Syracuse college football program
 William Galbraith (gymnast) (1906–1994), American gymnast and Olympic medalist at the 1920 Summer Olympics
 William E. Galbraith (1926–2012), National Commander of the American Legion
 William Galbraith (British Army officer) (1837–1906), Adjutant-General in India